Willem ("Wim") van Spingelen (born February 9, 1938 in Utrecht) is a former water polo player from the Netherlands, who was a member of the Dutch Men's National Team that finished in eighth position at the 1964 Summer Olympics in Tokyo, Japan.

References
 Dutch Olympic Committee

1938 births
Living people
Dutch male water polo players
Olympic water polo players of the Netherlands
Water polo players at the 1964 Summer Olympics
Sportspeople from Utrecht (city)
20th-century Dutch people